Sungai Lias is a small village within the town of Sungai Besar, Selangor, Malaysia.

Sabak Bernam District
Villages in Selangor